Constantin Ionescu was a Romanian politician, mayor of Chişinău between 1931–1932.

Notes

External links 
 Primari ai oraşului Chişinău

Mayors of Chișinău